Partition of Czechoslovakia may refer to:
 German occupation of Czechoslovakia
 Munich Agreement
 First Vienna Award
 Dissolution of Czechoslovakia